Erewhon is a novel by Samuel Butler.

Erewhon may also refer to:
 Erewhon (album), a 1996 album by David Thomas and Two Pale Boys
 Erewhon Basin, an ice-free area in Antarctica
 Erewhon Market, a California natural foods company
 Erewhon, a place by the Rangitata River of New Zealand near the spot used for Edoras in Peter Jackson's film of The Two Towers